Guram Gogolauri (born 28 April 1944) is a Georgian judoka. He competed in the men's middleweight event at the 1972 Summer Olympics, representing the Soviet Union.

References

1944 births
Living people
Male judoka from Georgia (country)
Olympic judoka of the Soviet Union
Judoka at the 1972 Summer Olympics
People from Kakheti